Banphot Phisai is the northernmost district (amphoe) of Nakhon Sawan province, central Thailand.

History
At first, the central tambon was Tambon Ta Sang. In 1910, the government moved the district office to the west bank of the Ping River in the Tambon Tha Ngiew area and upgraded the district at the same time.

The name Banphot Phisai comes from the mountains in the district that look likes rows of prang.

In September 2020, Khao No, a promontory in the district, was claimed by locals to be the habitat of a giant ape. A photo was produced as evidence. The story went viral in Thailand, attracting many to the area. Primatologists said the creature sighted on the hilltop was most likely just an ordinary monkey.

Geography
Neighboring districts are (from the northeast clockwise): Bueng Na Rang and Pho Thale of Phichit province; Kao Liao, Mueang Nakhon Sawan, and Lat Yao of Nakhon Sawan Province; and Khanu Woralaksaburi and Bueng Samakkhi of Kamphaeng Phet province.

Administration
The district is divided into 13 subdistricts (tambons), which are further subdivided into 117 villages (mubans). The township (thesaban tambon) Banphot Phisai covers parts of tambons Tha Ngio and Charoen Phon. There are further 13 Tambon Administrative Organizations (TAO).

References

Banphot Phisai